Adam White may refer to:

Adam White (footballer) (born 1976), Australian sportsman and filmmaker
Adam White (Medal of Honor) (1823–1895), American soldier, Medal of Honor recipient
Adam White (minister) (c. 1627–1708), Scottish Presbyterian minister
Adam White (MP), British Member of Parliament for Winchelsea
Adam White (volleyball) (born 1989), Australian volleyball player
Adam White (zoologist) (1817–1878), Scottish zoologist

Adam White (EastEnders), fictional character